Elections to Fermanagh District Council were held on 20 May 1981 on the same day as the other Northern Irish local government elections. The election used five district electoral areas to elect a total of 20 councillors.

Election results

Note: "Votes" are the first preference votes.

Districts summary

|- class="unsortable" align="centre"
!rowspan=2 align="left"|Ward
! % 
!Cllrs
! % 
!Cllrs
! %
!Cllrs
! %
!Cllrs
! %
!Cllrs
!rowspan=2|TotalCllrs
|- class="unsortable" align="center"
!colspan=2 bgcolor="" | UUP
!colspan=2 bgcolor="" | IIP
!colspan=2 bgcolor="" | SDLP
!colspan=2 bgcolor="" | DUP
!colspan=2 bgcolor="white"| Others
|-
|align="left"|Area A
|21.3
|2
|19.6
|1
|13.8
|0
|8.3
|0
|bgcolor="#CDFFAB"|37.0
|bgcolor="#CDFFAB"|1
|4
|-
|align="left"|Area B
|bgcolor="40BFF5"|52.0
|bgcolor="40BFF5"|2
|21.5
|1
|12.4
|0
|14.1
|1
|0.0
|0
|4
|-
|align="left"|Area C
|27.6
|1
|bgcolor=#32CD32|33.7
|bgcolor=#32CD32|1
|16.5
|1
|7.9
|0
|14.3
|1
|4
|-
|align="left"|Area D
|bgcolor="40BFF5"|36.8
|bgcolor="40BFF5"|2
|15.8
|0
|25.9
|1
|18.6
|1
|2.9
|0
|4
|-
|align="left"|Area E
|bgcolor="40BFF5"|34.3
|bgcolor="40BFF5"|2
|22.5
|1
|19.9
|1
|12.6
|0
|10.7
|0
|5
|- class="unsortable" class="sortbottom" style="background:#C9C9C9"
|align="left"| Total
|34.0
|8
|22.3
|4
|17.8
|4
|12.3
|2
|13.6
|2
|20
|-
|}

Districts results

Area A

1977: 1 x UUP, 1 x SDLP, 1 x Unity, 1 x Independent
1981: 1 x UUP, 1 x SDLP, 1 x IIP, 1 x Independent Republican
1977-1981 Change: IIP gain from Independent, Independent Republican leaves Unity

Area B

1977: 2 x UUP, 1 x UUUP, 1 x SDLP
1981: 2 x UUP, 1 x IIP, 1 x DUP
1977-1981 Change: IIP and DUP gain from UUUP and SDLP

Area C

1977: 1 x UUP, 1 x SDLP, 1 x Unity, 1 x Independent Nationalist
1981: 1 x UUP, 1 x SDLP, 1 x IIP, 1 x Independent Nationalist
1977-1981 Change: Unity joins IIP

Area D

1977: 2 x SDLP, 1 x UUP, 1 x UUUP
1981: 2 x UUP, 1 x SDLP, 1 x DUP
1977-1981 Change: UUP gain from SDLP, UUUP joins DUP

Area E

1977: 2 x SDLP, 1 x UUP, 1 x UUUP
1981: 2 x UUP, 1 x SDLP, 1 x IIP
1977-1981 Change: UUP and IIP gain from SDLP and UUUP

References

1981 Northern Ireland local elections
20th century in County Fermanagh
Fermanagh District Council elections